Coleophora batangica is a moth of the family Coleophoridae that is  endemic to Tibet, China.

References

External links

batangica
Moths of Asia
Endemic fauna of Tibet
Moths described in 1989